Metroid Dread is an action-adventure game developed by Nintendo and MercurySteam and published by Nintendo for the Nintendo Switch. It was released on October 8, 2021. Set after the events of Metroid Fusion (2002), players control bounty hunter Samus Aran as she investigates the source of a mysterious transmission on the planet ZDR. It retains the side-scrolling gameplay of previous 2D Metroid games and incorporates stealth elements.

Metroid producer Yoshio Sakamoto conceived Dread for the Nintendo DS in the mid-2000s, but development ended due to technical limitations. Industry commentators expressed interest in a new 2D Metroid game, and listed Dread in their "most wanted" lists. After their work on Metroid: Samus Returns in 2017, Sakamoto appointed MercurySteam to develop Dread, the first original side-scrolling Metroid game since Metroid Fusion. Nintendo announced it at E3 2021.

Metroid Dread received critical acclaim. At the Game Awards 2021, it received three nominations including Game of the Year, winning for Best Action/Adventure Game. It became the fastest-selling Metroid game in Japan, the UK and the US, and has sold nearly three million copies, making it the best-selling Metroid game.

Gameplay
Metroid Dread is an action-adventure game in which players control bounty hunter Samus Aran as she explores the planet ZDR. It retains the side-scrolling gameplay of previous Metroid games, alongside the free aim and melee attacks added in Samus Returns (2017). As the player explores, they discover new items and weapons, allowing them to access new areas.

Dread adds stealth elements, with Samus avoiding the EMMI robots in certain areas by hiding, reducing her noise, and using the Phantom Cloak, camouflage that makes her invisible but slows her movement. If an EMMI catches Samus, the player has two brief chances to perform melee counters and escape. If they fail, Samus is killed. EMMIs can only be destroyed when Samus obtains the temporary "Omega Blaster" upgrade, which is lost upon using it to destroy one; however, destroying an EMMI grants Samus a new permanent upgrade. Upgrades can also be found by finding Chozo statues or destroying a Core-X like in previous games. Players unlock images in an in-game gallery based on their completion time, difficulty level, and percentage of items collected.

Plot

The Galactic Federation receives evidence that the X, a dangerous species of parasite that can mimic any creature it infects, survives on the remote planet ZDR. They dispatch seven EMMI (Extraplanetary Multiform Mobile Identifiers) robots to ZDR to investigate, but lose contact. The Federation sends Samus Aran to ZDR to investigate.

Underground, Samus encounters a Chozo warrior, who destroys the exit, defeats her in combat and strips her suit of most of its abilities. Her ship's computer, Adam, instructs her to find another path to the surface and return to her ship. Samus is attacked by the EMMI, which have been reprogrammed. She escapes and absorbs a mysterious energy from one of the planet's central units. The energy temporarily enables the Omega Blaster, with which she destroys the EMMI and regains some of her abilities.

In Ferenia, Samus is captured by another EMMI, but is saved by a Chozo named Quiet Robe, who deactivates them. Quiet Robe explains that, long ago, two Chozo tribes, the scientific Thoha and warrior Mawkin, banded together to trap the Metroids on the planet SR388. The Thoha intended to destroy SR388, but Raven Beak, the Mawkin leader, wanted to use the Metroids as a bioweapon to conquer the galaxy. He slaughtered the Thoha tribe and spared Quiet Robe so the Metroids could be controlled with his Thoha DNA. He planned to use ZDR to house Metroids, but had to contain an infestation of the X while Samus eradicated the Metroids from SR388. Raven Beak reprogrammed the EMMI robots and lured Samus to ZDR to extract the Metroid DNA implanted in her during the events of Fusion, which would allow him to revive the Metroids.

Quiet Robe opens a barrier to allow Samus to progress before he is assassinated by one of Raven Beak's robotic soldiers. Adam encourages Samus to defeat Raven Beak and destroy ZDR. In Elun, Samus encounters the X parasites and inadvertently releases them into the rest of the planet. One of the X possesses Quiet Robe's corpse and reactivates the remaining EMMI. Samus arrives on the surface, where she is attacked by the last of the EMMI. She destroys it by sapping its energy with her hand, a power gained from her Metroid DNA. As a side effect, Samus is slowly becoming a Metroid.

On the floating fortress of Itorash, Samus confronts Raven Beak, who has been masquerading as Adam. Raven Beak reveals that he spared her before so that she would awaken her Metroid powers, at which point he would clone her to create an army of the most powerful Metroid of all. Samus battles Raven Beak and is nearly killed, but the Metroid abilities within her grant her incredible power. Samus attacks Raven Beak, draining energy from Itorash and causing it to crash into ZDR. Raven Beak is infected by an X, and Samus uses her newfound powers to destroy him. Samus retreats to her ship as ZDR begins to self-destruct, but is unable to use it due to her energy-draining Metroid powers. The X possessing Quiet Robe appears and allows itself to be absorbed into Samus to neutralize her Metroid abilities, allowing her to escape the planet before it explodes.

Development

Early efforts

The Metroid producer Yoshio Sakamoto conceived Metroid Dread as a Nintendo DS sequel to Metroid Fusion (2002). It came from the concept of having Samus followed by "dread" on an unfamiliar planet. Sakamoto wanted to expand on the stealth sequences in Fusion and combine them with traditional Metroid gameplay. Though he did not want Dread to be a horror game, he aimed to explore "fear-based gameplay".

Sakamoto attempted to have Dread developed for the DS. A first attempt was made around 2005, and another around 2008. A playable prototype was shown to Nintendo Software Technology and Nintendo of America staff at E3 2009. The project was reportedly not titled Metroid Dread at that point and had an art style similar to Metroid Fusion. The prototype did not meet Sakamoto's expectations, so development was halted. A major reason for this was that Sakamoto's desire for an intimidating, unsettling antagonist was difficult to achieve with the DS hardware.

The title Metroid Dread first appeared on a 2005 internal Nintendo software list of "key DS games set to be announced in the future", triggering expectation that it would appear at the E3 convention in 2005 or 2006. By late 2005, rumors spread that Metroid Dread had been canceled or was in development hell. A release date of November 2006 was listed in the February issue of Official Nintendo Magazine. The March issue listed a release date for 2006, with a suggestion to look to E3 2006 for further details, but the game did not appear.

A message reading "Experiment status report update: Metroid project 'Dread' is nearing the final stages of completion" appears in the 2007 game Metroid Prime 3: Corruption. Corruption director Mark Pacini denied any connection and said that it was coincidental. The Wired writer Chris Kohler expressed skepticism over Retro's denial; he felt it would be believable if Pacini said that it was a joke, but the claim that it was a coincidence was not. In the Japanese version, released later that year, the message instead refers to a "dread class turret".

Later discussion
In 2010, Sakamoto said that Nintendo would "start from scratch" if they returned to the Dread project. He also said that they were "waiting and watching and reading the comments to see what people are interested in before we make any comment on the project". In other interviews, he denied that the Wii game Metroid: Other M (2010) and the Nintendo 3DS game Metroid: Samus Returns (2017) were connected to Dread. In May 2010, IGN Craig Harris said that the story for Metroid Dread was complete, and that Nintendo was able to "bring it back at any time".

Following the game's initial listing, critics expressed an interest in Metroid Dread or a similar 2D side-scrolling Metroid project being revived. In 2011, IGN cited it as a "game in danger". K. Thor Jensen included it in his list of "video games you will never, ever play". He felt that Metroid: Other M was a disappointment and it made him nostalgic for Dread. Thomas East included Dread and its apparent reference in Corruption in their list of "11 amazing Metroid facts and secrets". East added that he was hopeful for a possible 3DS release.

Marc Zablotny, a writer for the Official Nintendo Magazine, included it in his 2013 wishlist, saying he was more interested in what Dread "stood for rather than the specific game itself". Zablotny later included it in a list of the "15 more Nintendo Games you never got to play" and called it one of the most infamous cancelled Nintendo games. Nick Chester from Destructoid criticized Nintendo for its focus on games such as the Brain Age series over Metroid.

Revival on Nintendo Switch
During Nintendo's E3 2021 Nintendo Direct presentation on June 15, Nintendo announced that Metroid Dread was in development for the Nintendo Switch, with a release date of October 8, 2021. Dread was developed by the Spanish developer MercurySteam, the studio that developed Metroid: Samus Returns, and Nintendo EPD. Sakamoto said that Nintendo revived the project after seeing what MercurySteam could do with its technology on the Switch. Dread is the first fully original side-scrolling Metroid game since Fusion.

Reception

On the review aggregator website Metacritic, Metroid Dread has a score of 88 out of 100, indicating "generally favorable" reviews. Samuel Claiborn of IGN praised the boss fights, writing that they "range from the traditional big, drooling monsters with patterns and weak points to learn, to almost Smash Bros.-esque encounters with enemies that mimic your move set". Chris Carter of Destructoid said Dread "masterfully" executed the Metroidvania formula, and that it "doesn’t take a lot of big swings, but it rarely bats a foul ball". Nintendo Lifes PJ O'Reilly liked the returning mechanics and the newer additions, saying "it always feels as though you've got a ton of choice in how to explore and move around your richly detailed surroundings". Joe Findly of CGM wrote that "Metroid Dread is a wonderful, modern take on a classic game from childhood". IGN wrote that it "brings back the legendary exploration and progression and merges it with excellent modern combat and some of the best boss fights ever".

Sales
Metroid Dread pre-orders topped the Amazon Video Game Best Sellers list in the US, UK, Japan, and Australia. It was also the most pre-ordered game following E3 2021 at GameStop.

Dread had the highest-grossing physical launch of the franchise in the UK, debuting at number three on the weekly video games sales charts. Including digital copies, the game is also the fastest-selling Metroid game in the UK. In the United States, Dread debuted at #3 and sold 854,000 copies in its first month, making it the fastest-selling Metroid, according to Nintendo of America president Doug Bowser. In Japan, it debuted at number one, selling 86,798 retail copies in its first week of release. Including digital copies, Dread outsold the life-to-date sales of nearly every Metroid game in Japan in its first week. By May 10, 2022, it had sold more than 2.9 million copies worldwide, making it the best-selling Metroid game.

Awards and accolades
At the Game Awards 2021, Metroid Dread won the award for Best Action/Adventure Game. At the Golden Joystick Awards, it won in the category Nintendo Game of the Year. It was also named Game of the Year by Time and Digital Trends.

Notes

References

External links
 

2021 video games
Cancelled Nintendo DS games
Golden Joystick Award winners
Metroid games
Metroidvania games
Nintendo Switch games
Nintendo Switch-only games
Side-scrolling video games
Single-player video games
The Game Awards winners
Vaporware video games
Video games about robots
Video games developed in Japan
Video games developed in Spain
Video games featuring female protagonists
Video games set on fictional planets
Video games that use Amiibo figurines